The United States announced its withdrawal from the Joint Comprehensive Plan of Action (JCPOA), also known as the "Iran nuclear deal" or the "Iran deal", on May 8, 2018. The JCPOA is an agreement on Iran's nuclear program reached in July 2015 by Iran, the P5+1 (the five permanent members of the United Nations Security Council—China, France, Russia, United Kingdom, United States—plus Germany) also called E3/EU+3.

In a joint statement responding to the U.S. withdrawal, the leaders of France, Germany and the United Kingdom stated that United Nations Security Council resolution endorsing the nuclear deal remained the "binding international legal framework for the resolution of the dispute".

Various countries, international organizations, and U.S. scholars have expressed regret or criticized the withdrawal, while U.S. conservatives, Israel, Saudi Arabia and allies have supported it.

The withdrawal caused concerns in Iran due to its impact on the economy.

On 17 May 2018 the European Commission announced its intention to implement the blocking statute of 1996 to declare U.S. sanctions against Iran illegal in Europe and ban European citizens and companies from complying with them. The commission also instructed the European Investment Bank to facilitate European companies' investment in Iran.

Background 

In July 2015, an agreement was concluded with Iran, China, France, Germany, Russia, the United Kingdom, the United States and the European Union. It provided that Iran's nuclear activities would be limited in exchange for reduced sanctions. According to the JCPOA, every 90 days the President of the United States would certify, among other things, that Iran was adhering to the terms of the agreement. Leading up to the United States' withdrawal, the IAEA asserted that its inspectors had verified that Iran had implemented its nuclear-related commitments since the agreement. Describing the view of the U.S. State Department, assistant secretary for legislative affairs Julia Frifield wrote, "The JCPOA is not a treaty or an executive agreement, and is not a signed document. The JCPOA reflects political commitments between Iran, the P5+1, and the EU."

With the conclusion of the agreement, then-candidate Donald Trump made the renegotiation of the JCPOA one of his main foreign affairs campaign promises, saying at a campaign rally that "this deal, if I win, will be a totally different deal." Trump described the Iran deal as a "disaster", "the worst deal ever", and so "terrible" that could lead to "a nuclear holocaust".

The Trump administration certified in April 2017 and in July 2017 that Iran was complying with the deal. On October 13, 2017, Trump announced that the United States would not make the certification provided for under U.S. domestic law, on the basis that the suspension of sanctions was not "proportionate and appropriate," but stopped short of terminating the deal.

International context
The JCPOA ended some of the sanctions on Iran while suspending others, subject to waivers. These include waivers of oil sanctions implemented in January 2012, which require periodic re-certification. Throughout 2017 Trump contemplated not re-certifying, and thus effectively pulling out of the deal. According to Jarrett Blanc of the Obama administration, since the JCPOA is not a treaty but an agreement between several countries, it has no formal provisions for withdrawal, but a member of the deal could stop complying with its obligations.

Following Trump's denial of the deal, the European Union's foreign policy chief, Federica Mogherini, said the JCPOA was a firm decision and that no single country could break it. She proposed a "collective process" to preserve the deal, saying, "This deal is not a bilateral agreement ... The international community, and the European Union with it, has clearly indicated that the deal is, and will, continue to be in place." French President Emmanuel Macron warned Trump not to withdraw from the deal, and told German magazine Der Spiegel that doing so "would open the Pandora's box. There could be war." The Global Times, a Chinese newspaper, wrote that America's reputation as a major power would be undermined in the eyes of the world if it reneged on a deal simply because of a transition in government.

Political influences and decisions
Some reports suggest that Israeli prime minister Benjamin Netanyahu's "Iran Lied" presentation influenced the withdrawal. A little more than a week after Netanyahu's presentation, Trump announced that the U.S. would withdraw from the deal. He announced the withdrawal during a speech at the White House on May 8, 2018, saying, "the heart of the Iran deal was a giant fiction: that a murderous regime desired only a peaceful nuclear energy program." Trump added that there was "definitive proof that this Iranian promise was a lie. Last week, Israel published intelligence documents — long concealed by Iran — conclusively showing the Iranian regime and its history of pursuing nuclear weapons." According to Trump's secretary of state Mike Pompeo and the International Atomic Energy Agency, the agency tasked with verifying and monitoring Iran's compliance with the JCPOA, Iran has been in compliance with the JCPOA and there is no evidence otherwise. According to David Makovsky, a Middle East scholar at the Washington Institute for Near East Policy, Iran was not in compliance, because under the deal's terms Iran was supposed to reveal all of its research into nuclear weapons, and that based on Netanyahu's evidence, “it seems clear that they did not.”

Role of George Nader 
In March 2018, The New York Times reported that George Nader, a lobbyist for the United Arab Emirates, turned Trump's major fundraiser Elliott Broidy "into an instrument of influence at the White House for the rulers of Saudi Arabia and the United Arab Emirates...High on the agenda of the two men...was pushing the White House to remove Secretary of State Rex W. Tillerson", a top defender of the Iran deal in the Trump administration, and "backing confrontational approaches to Iran and Qatar". Mark Dubowitz of the Foundation for Defense of Democracies (FDD) was critical of the deal, though he later said he wanted to "save" it. A "trove of hacked emails" show that FDD was also funded by George Nader through Elliott Broidy.

Role of John Bolton
Unlike FDD and Trump officials such as National Security Adviser H. R. McMaster and Secretary of State Rex Tillerson, former UN ambassador (and later National Security Advisor) John Bolton campaigned for a complete withdrawal from the JCPOA and rejected the idea that it could be fixed. Unable at the time to present his position to Trump directly, Bolton published his proposal for how to withdraw from the deal in an August 28, 2017, National Review article. After he was named to succeed McMaster as National Security Adviser in April 2018, Bolton pressed Trump to withdraw from the JCPOA, which Trump did a month later.

Resignation of the special representative

On August 6, 2020, the State Department's special representative for Iran, Brian Hook, announced his resignation. Many viewed this as a tacit admission that the so-called maximum pressure policy toward Iran had failed. Hook resigned just before a U.S.-led U.N. Security Council vote on whether to prolong an embargo on the sale of weapons to Iran set to expire in October. Most experts believed that Russia and China would veto the extension, allowing Iran to start buying arms again from whomever it likes.

The UN security council overwhelmingly rejected the US resolution to extend the embargo, with only two votes in favor and 11 abstentions. Trump said at a news conference, “We’ll be doing a snapback. You’ll be watching it next week”. This referred to the legal claim that the US remains a participant in the 2015 Iran nuclear deal despite having withdrawn from it, a claim Washington's European allies reject.

Announcement

At 2:00 p.m. Eastern Standard Time, Trump announced that the United States would withdraw from the Joint Comprehensive Plan of Action. He called the agreement "a horrible one-sided deal that should have never, ever been made" and added, "[i]t didn't bring calm, it didn't bring peace, and it never will."

Reactions

Support 

:
 The Republican Party (GOP) supported Trump's decision to withdraw.
 US ambassador to the United Nations Nikki Haley said that Trump "absolutely made the right decision".
 Secretary of State Mike Pompeo supported the withdrawal.
 National Security Adviser John Bolton supported the decision.
 Former vice president Dick Cheney supported the withdrawal.
: Saudi Arabia supported and welcomed Trump’s decision and “supports reinstating economic sanctions on the Iranian regime, which have been suspended under the nuclear deal”, according to the official SPA news agency.
: Prime Minister Benjamin Netanyahu, in a live televised address shortly after the announcement of U.S. withdrawal, said, "Israel fully supports President Trump’s bold decision today to reject the disastrous nuclear deal with the terrorist regime in Tehran."

Opposition 

:
 Secretary-General António Guterres said he is "deeply concerned by [the] announcement that the United States will be withdrawing from the Joint Comprehensive Plan of Action (JCPOA) and will begin reinstating US sanctions".
:
 The Democratic Party criticized Trump's decision to withdraw.
 Former president Barack Obama said "the deal was working and it was in US interests."
 Former secretary of state John Kerry said that the US should have preserved the deal.
 Former national security advisor Susan Rice said it was a "foolish decision".
 Former secretary of energy Ernest Moniz said the withdrawal was a "major strategic mistake".
 Former deputy secretary of energy Elizabeth Sherwood-Randall said the decision was "a reckless strategic mistake of immense consequence".
 Former ambassador to NATO Nicholas Burns said the disavowal was "reckless and one of the most serious mistakes of his presidency".
 Former NSA director, former CIA director, retired USAF four-star general Michael Hayden said that "Iran is further away from a weapon with this deal than they would be without it".
 Senator from Vermont Bernie Sanders criticized the decision: "Trump's speech today was the latest in a series of reckless decisions that move our country closer to conflict."
 Harvard political scientist Gary Samore said that if "President Trump thinks he can crash the nuclear deal, reimpose international economic sanctions, and force Iran to negotiate a better deal, he is mistaken".
 Harvard political scientist Graham T. Allison said that it was "a bad choice for the U.S. and bad choice for our ally Israel".
 Harvard political scientist Matthew Bunn said that Trump had freed Iran to build up its ability to make nuclear bomb material.
 Harvard political scientist Stephen Walt said it was Trump's "most consequential foreign-policy blunder".
 Former secretary of state Colin Powell reiterated his longstanding support for the Iran Nuclear Deal, 5/16/2018
: In an official statement, the Ministry of Foreign Affairs declared that they were extremely concerned that the United States was repeatedly acting contrary to the opinion of the majority of states and exclusively in its own narrow-minded and opportunistic interests, in flagrant violation of international law.
:
 A Declaration by the High Representative on behalf of the EU "deeply regrets the announcement by US President Trump to withdraw from the Joint Comprehensive Plan of Action".
 Even though The European Council on Foreign Relations does not take collective positions, several of its Council Members have signed a European Joint Call on the US to "reconsider its approach to the JCPOA".
: China's Special Envoy on the Middle East Issue, Gong Xiaosheng stated that the People's Republic of China would continue to preserve and implement the comprehensive agreement on Iran's nuclear program, saying that 'dialogue is better than confrontation'.
:
 Former French president François Hollande said that Donald Trump's personality was driven by "its cynicism, its vulgarity and its egocentricity" and, therefore, the only thing he wanted was "to tear up the deal".
 The French minister of foreign affairs, Jean-Yves Le Drian, expressed concern about the political stability of the region, but reaffirmed that the deal was not dead despite the American withdrawal.
 Former French minister of foreign affairs Laurent Fabius said the withdrawal was "extremely dangerous for the stability of the Middle East".
:
 Former UK prime minister David Cameron said that the Iran deal was "so much better" than any alternative.
:
 Speaking to BBC's HARDtalk, Turkish President Recep Tayyip Erdoğan called the U.S. withdrawal problematic and said that "continuity between states is fundamental".
: Jan Kickert, Austrian permanent representative to the United Nations, denounced as “wrong and unjustifiable” a move by the U.S. administration to decertify Iran's compliance with the Iran deal.
:
 In a meeting with Iranian labor minister Ali Rabie, Finnish minister of labor Jari Tapani Lindström said that Finland is still committed to the nuclear deal.
:
 Portugal regrets the USA's rejection of the Iran nuclear deal and Portuguese minister of internal administration Eduardo Cabrita has affirmed that Portugal will continue to respect the agreement.
:
 Spain pulled a frigate from U.S. Gulf mission due to differences over Iran, accusing the U.S. government of taking "a decision outside of the framework of what had been agreed with the Spanish Navy".
: Former Israeli prime minister Ehud Barak said Trump's decision made the world "more uncertain".

Diplomatic consequences

Supporting countries 

's government issued a statement welcoming the withdrawal.
  supported the withdrawal.
's prime minister Benjamin Netanyahu called the withdrawal a "brave decision".
 's Foreign Ministry stated that "Iran used economic gains from the lifting of sanctions to continue its activities to destabilize the region, particularly by developing ballistic missiles and supporting terrorist groups in the region."
' Foreign Ministry has announced support for the decision.
's government announced its full support for the decision.

Opposing countries

Remaining JCPOA Participants 
's Ayatollah Ali Khamenei, the supreme leader of Iran, calling Trump's words "cheap and petty", said during a speech: "We kept saying not to trust the US and here is the result.... Aside from at least 10 obvious lies, this person [Donald Trump] threatened the nation of Iran and the Islamic Republic, which I, on behalf of the nation of Iran, respond with: Like hell you will!... The persistent enmity of the US is with the nature of the [Islamic] system and the nuclear energy is nothing more than an excuse. If we go along with their wishes today, tomorrow they will bring more excuses.... Our officials and authorities tell me that they want to continue the JCPOA with these three European countries [France, Germany and the United Kingdom]. I don't trust these three countries either." President Hassan Rouhani said: "The US has announced that it doesn't respect its commitments." He stated Iran's intention of continuing the nuclear deal, but ultimately doing what's best for the country, "I have directed the Atomic Energy Agency to prepare for the next steps, if necessary, to begin our own industrial enrichment without restriction," Rouhani said in a statement just minutes after Trump withdrew the US from the Iran nuclear deal. "We will wait several weeks before acting on this decision. We will be consulting with friends, our allies and members who have signed on to the agreement. Everything depends on our national interests. If our nation's interests are attained in the end, we will continue the process." He stated that the nuclear deal would continue if Iran was able to meet the demands of the Iranian people with the cooperation of five countries in a short period.
 top diplomat Federica Mogherini said the EU was "determined to preserve the deal". The EU Commission president, Jean-Claude Juncker, understand that the US does not want anymore to co-operate with other countries. According to him, the US as an international actor has lost vigour, and will lose influence in the long term.
's economy minister Bruno Le Maire said It was "not acceptable" for the US to be the "economic policeman of the planet". Leaders of France, Germany, and the United Kingdom have jointly expressed "regret" at Trump's decision.
 expressed "regret" at Trump's decision.
 expressed "regret" at Trump's decision. 
's Kremlin spokesman Dmitry Peskov told reporters there would be "inevitable harmful consequences to any actions towards breaking [the Joint Comprehensive Plan of Action]." Russian foreign minister Sergey Lavrov criticized the United States, saying "once again we see that Washington is trying to revise key international agreements, this time to the Joint Comprehensive Plan of Action, the Jerusalem issue and a number of other agreements."
's foreign ministry reiterated that all sides should continue to uphold their end of the agreement and that the International Atomic Energy Agency (IAEA) has said many times that Iran is in compliance with the agreement. Hua Chunying, spokeswoman of China's Foreign Ministry, said that "[a]ll sides need to continue upholding the pact."

Middle East 
's foreign minister Ayman Safadi warned of "dangerous repercussions" and a possible arms race in the Middle East unless a political solution was found to free the region of nuclear weapons and other weapons of mass destruction.
 "strongly" condemned Trump's decision to withdraw from the Iran nuclear agreement.

G20 states 
's prime minister Malcolm Turnbull said that he regrets the decision.
's prime minister Paolo Gentiloni said the Iran nuclear agreement must be preserved.
's foreign ministry said Japan continues to support the deal and that it "hopes for a continued constructive response from the nations involved".
's presidential spokesman İbrahim Kalın said the decision by the United States to unilaterally withdraw from the 2015 Iran nuclear deal will cause instability and new conflicts.

Others 
's minister of foreign affairs Simon Coveney said he was "greatly disappointed by the US announcement that it is withdrawing from the nuclear agreement with Iran".
' deputy vice prime minister Hugo de Jonge said that the Netherlands will try to keep the Iran deal intact as much as possible, and will make efforts to this end on a diplomatic level. Furthermore, he said that the Dutch government finds the decision by American president Trump to pull out of the Iran deal extremely unwise, since it will impact international security and thus also the security of the Netherlands.
's prime minister Jacinda Ardern said the withdrawal was a step backwards.
's permanent representative to the United Nations Foo Kok Jwee urged "all relevant parties to remain committed to the JCPoA".
's prime minister Mariano Rajoy criticized Trump's decision to leave the Iran deal.
's authorities said the US withdrawal does not change their position and respect for the accord. In January 2020, the Swiss Humanitarian Trade Arrangement (SHTA) was implemented, assuring export guarantees through Swiss financial institutions for shipments of food and medical products to Iran.

Neutral countries 
  reiterated its friendly and cooperative relations with the United States of America and the Islamic Republic of Iran, and stated that it will continue to follow-up on this development and make all possible and available efforts to maintain the security and the stability in the region. Oman's Ministry of Foreign Affairs said that they value the stance of the five partners to adhere to this agreement, thus contributing to regional and international security and stability.
  stressed that the main priority is to free the Middle East from nuclear weapons and to prevent the entry of regional powers in a nuclear arms race.
  called for diplomacy to resolve the dispute over the Iran nuclear deal. The foreign ministry was measured in its response: "All parties should engage constructively to address and resolve issues that have arisen with respect to the JCPOA," the foreign ministry said in a statement.

Public opinion in the United States
A majority of Americans said the United States should remain in the JCPOA.

According to the CNN poll conducted between May 2, 2018, and May 5, 2018, the strongest proponents of withdrawing from the deal were Republicans at 51%.

According to the Pew Research Center, 53% of the American public and 94% of U.S. scholars in international relations disapproved of Trump's decision to withdraw from the Iran nuclear weapons agreement.

Aftermath 

According to Tony Blinken, a former Obama deputy secretary of state who took part in the negotiation of the original deal, the JCPOA's future depends on Iran's willingness to abide by it, and so on the economic benefit the deal will give Iran. The Israeli military put their forces on alert. Israeli citizens living in the Golan Heights were told to prepare bomb shelters.

Trade
Trump also wanted to sanction European companies that trade with Tehran.

After the JCPOA was announced, in December 2016, Boeing signed a $17 billion deal with Iran and Airbus signed a $19 billion one. These deals were subsequently canceled. China is involved in a $1.5 billion deal for infrastructure, and its CITIC bank provides $10 billion lines of credit to Iranian banks. Using euros and the yuan, this bank should not be subject to US sanctions against companies that use US dollars.

The French company Total S.A. won a project in the South Pars gas field that could be hit by US sanctions. In anticipation of a possible pull-out by Total, Chinese company CNPC signed a $1 billion deal giving it the option to take over Total's commitments.

Oil prices became unstable amid uncertainty of how President Trump's sanctions might affect the flow of crude oil out of Iran. According to some experts, oil supplies may be affected if Iran reduces its export.
In a phone interview with MSNBC, Former Secretary of State John Kerry said, "[Trump] has taken a situation where there was no crisis, and created crisis." "We [the United States] are in breach of the agreement," Kerry warned.
On Wednesday, May 9, 2018, on the floor of the Iranian Parliament, Majlis, conservative MPs, set fire to a copy of the JCPOA amid chants of "death to America." They also set fire to a United States flag. Meanwhile, Iranian President Hassan Rouhani has attempted to moderate Iran's response. Rouhani promised to abide by the agreement for the time being and directed his diplomats to negotiate with the deal's remaining participants, saying the agreement could survive without the United States.
 John Hultquist, director of intelligence analysis at FireEye, a Milpitas, California cybersecurity company, said that Iran might attempt cyberattacks on American infrastructure: "They were in some very sensitive areas of airport networks where they could conceivably cause serious disruption ...but the malicious code was identified and the hackers were booted off". He declined to identify which U.S. airports were affected, saying only that there were multiple targets.
Iranian Oil Minister Bijan Zanganeh said, "Trump's decision will not have any impact on our oil export".
Ayatollah Ahmad Khatami said, "The holy system of the Islamic Republic will step up its missile capabilities day by day so that Israel, this occupying regime, will become sleepless and the nightmare will constantly haunt it that if it does anything foolish, we will raze Tel Aviv and Haifa to the ground".
 Iran announced its readiness to enrich uranium on an "industrial scale" starting in 2025. Iran's Atomic Energy Organization said in a statement, "The President of the Atomic Energy Organization of Iran has been tasked with taking all necessary steps in preparation for Iran to pursue industrial-scale enrichment without any restrictions, using the results of the latest research and development of Iran's brave nuclear scientists".

Economic impact

Iran

According to United Nations Special Rapporteur Idriss Jazairy, the reimposition of economic sanctions after the unilateral U.S. withdrawal in 2018 "is destroying the economy and currency of Iran, driving millions of people into poverty and making imported goods unaffordable." He appealed to the U.S. and the European Union to ensure that Iranian financial institutions can make payments for essential goods, including foods, medicines and industrial imports. The Office of the United Nations High Commissioner for Human Rights stressed that "sanctions must not harm the human rights of ordinary citizens."

In November 2019, when the Trump administration further tightened financial sanctions and the rial's devaluation continued, a subsequent increase in energy prices caused widespread protests and violent confrontations in Tehran and other major cities. The economies of border regions with urban areas, such as Zahedan, felt the most drastic impact as traders had to pay more for imports, e.g. electronic appliances, while at the same time, the export value for manufactured goods, such as Persian rugs, decreased. Iraq's economy was also seriously affected by the continued financial sanctions, since Iran is a major exporter of wheat to Iraq, and food prices increased in Iraq after 2016.

In September 2022, the IMF concluded in a working paper, "coupled with low economic growth and high unemployment, rising inflation has fueled widespread protests in the country amid a significant erosion in purchasing power." According to an estimate by Iran’s Ministry of Labour and Social Services, Western sanctions have pushed one-third of Iranians into poverty. Iranian analyst Abdolreza Davari confirmed that economic despair is one of the major factors uniting those who oppose Ebrahim Raisi's government. The protests themselves, triggered by the death of Mahsa Amini in mid-September, were seen as a possible stumbling block to revive JCPOA negotiations, as more sanctions were imposed on Iranian officials.

Global economy

According to a study by Harvard Business School, Iran could play a larger role in global energy markets if sanctions are lifted. But IranPoll found that only 47% of Iran’s citizens approve of the nuclear deal, compared to 76% when it was originally introduced. The study also concluded that a revival of the JCPOA could be good for global equities. Even if a new agreement is out of reach, lifting secondary U.S. sanctions on Chinese and Indian entities could free up more than 1 million barrels of oil per day.

See also 
 Project Amad
 May 2018 Israel–Iran incidents
 United States withdrawal from the Paris Agreement
 United States withdrawal from the United Nations
 European Union blocking statute

References 

2018 in international relations
Withdrawal from the Joint Comprehensive Plan of Action
2018 controversies
2018 controversies in the United States
May 2018 events in the United States
 
Nuclear program of Iran
Withdrawal from the Joint Comprehensive Plan of Action
Withdrawal from the Joint Comprehensive Plan of Action
Iran–United States relations